Bangladesh Television Chattogram or Bangladesh Television Chittagong, branded on-air as BTV Chittagong or BTV Chattogram, sometimes known as CTV, is a BTV-affiliated television station broadcast from Chittagong, serving southeastern Bangladesh. It is the network's first and currently the only regional television station. It was launched in 1996 and initially broadcast for one and a half hour, but the broadcast schedule significantly increased over time. It broadcasts on a full-day basis daily on both terrestrial and satellite television. BTV Chittagong started broadcasting on satellite television in 2016. It is also a nationwide terrestrial television station along with BTV Dhaka and Sangsad Television, as it reaches 75% of the area of Bangladesh terrestrially.

History

Initial broadcasts (1996–2016) 
On 19 December 1996, Sheikh Hasina, the prime minister of Bangladesh, inaugurated the first regional television station of Bangladesh Television in Chittagong, with financial and technical support from the Government of France. It only broadcast for one and a half hour at the time, within a 40 km limit via terrestrial television. BTV Chittagong was operated via a syndicate, and had acquired programs, which were subsequently broadcast on the station. It was also reported that the same artists have been shown on the station.

Celebrities have urged the station's authorities to increase its timings to properly showcase the culture, heritage, and the history of the Chittagong region. The authorities BTV Chittagong was also accused of mismanagement, leading the station to be in disarray. The station's broadcast time was later extended to two hours a day, and later to three hours.

In January 2009, BTV Chittagong filed a general diary against Ekushey Television for illegally using terrestrial signals for broadcasting in Chittagong, even after the government of Bangladesh ruled that only Bangladesh Television-affiliated stations can broadcast on terrestrial television in Bangladesh. Local police in the city later shut the terrestrial broadcasts on 6 January. Discussions for increasing BTV Chittagong's broadcast schedule took place in 2013, as an objective for the station to broadcast for twenty-four hours.

Satellite era 
On 28 September 2016, BTV Chittagong began experimental broadcasts via satellite television on a four-hour basis. It was later extended to six hours on 31 December 2016. This transmission was also broadcast to 60 countries worldwide. BTV Chittagong also debuted on cable television. On 13 April 2019, BTV Chittagong began broadcasting for nine hours on a daily basis, and also commenced transmissions via the Bangabandhu-1 satellite on 1 July 2019. Its broadcast time was later extended to twelve hours in December 2019. 

Twelve satellite and cable channels and two terrestrial channels can be operated using the tower, and on 3 September, the transmissions of BTV Chittagong, BTV Dhaka, Sangsad Television, and BTV World were commenced using the tower. On 19 December 2020, BTV Chittagong began airing English-language news programming.

On 10 January 2021, BTV Chittagong commenced transmissions for eighteen hours, which is identical to the broadcast timing of BTV Dhaka. In May 2021, BTV Chittagong was made available for streaming worldwide in the newly launched BTV app. On 17 June 2021, BTV Chittagong broadcast its first national debate. On 7 August 2021, the station broadcast live from its studios for the first time. 

On 19 December 2021, on its 25th anniversary, the station began broadcasting on a full day basis. On 29 January 2022, BTV Chittagong's former controller and program manager, Mahfuza Akhter, was appointed as BTV Chittagong's new general manager, replacing Nitai Kumar Bhattacharya. On the same day, a Bangabandhu Corner dedicated to the founding father of Bangladesh, Sheikh Mujibur Rahman, was inaugurated at the headquarters of BTV Chittagong. In observance of Eid al-Fitr 2022, the station broadcast the self-produced Anandamela. In May 2022, the Government of Bangladesh ordered the broadcast of BTV Chittagong, along with its sisters, in airports across the country.

Programming 

BTV Chittagong broadcasts local programming, and also programming dedicated to the indigenous peoples of the Chittagong Hill Tracts. Its programming line primarily consists of news, music, entertainment, and talk shows. It also plays an important role in promoting the culture of the Chittagong region and developing its tourism sector.

Broadcast time changes

References 

Bangladesh Television
Public television in Bangladesh
1996 establishments in Bangladesh
Television channels and stations established in 1996
Television in Bangladesh
Mass media in Chittagong
Television channels in Bangladesh